Kilcumny is a townland in County Westmeath, Ireland.

Kilcumny is one of 13 townlands of the civil parish of Kilcumny in the barony of Delvin in the Province of Leinster.

The neighbouring townlands are: Glananea or Ralphsdale to the north, Kilwalter to the north–east, Ballymacahill and Derries to the east, Barbavilla Demesne to the south and west and Robinstown to the north–west.

In the 1911 census of Ireland there were 12 houses and 36 inhabitants in the townland.

References

External links
Map of Kilcumny townland at openstreetmap.org
Kilcumny at the IreAtlas Townland Data Base
Kilcumny at Townlands.ie
Kilcumny at The Placenames Database of Ireland, Department of Arts, Heritage and the Gaeltacht

Townlands of County Westmeath